The abbé de La Marre (or La Mare) (Quimper, 1708 – Bavaria, 1742) was an 18th-century French homme de lettres. Voltaire was interested in him and gave him some literary works to do. He was a member of the Société du bout du banc hosted by Mlle Quinault.

Works 
1736: L'Ennui d'un quart d'heure
1736: Remarks on La Mort de César by Voltaire
1739: Le Je ne sais quoi de vingt minutes, poems
1739: Zaïde, reine de Grenade, ballet héroïque, music by Joseph Nicolas Pancrace Royer, given at the Académie royale de musique on 3 September
1739: Momus amoureux, one-act ballet, presented on 27 October
1753: With Antoine Houdar de La Motte, argument de Titon et l'Aurore, pastorale héroïque, libretto by Claude-Henri de Fusée de Voisenon, music by Jean-Joseph Cassanéa de Mondonville, premiered at the Académie royale de musique on 9 January
1766: Les Quarts d'heure d'un joyeux solitaire, (attr. ; reimp. 1882 under the title Contes de l'abbé de La Marre, les Quarts d'heure d'un joyeux solitaire)

Bibliography 
 Cardinal Georges Grente (dir.), Dictionnaire des lettres françaises. Le XVIIIe siècle, nlle. édition revue et mise à jour sous la direction de François Moureau, Paris, Fayard, 1995.

References

External links 
Abbé de La Marre on data.bnf.fr

Writers from Quimper
1708 births
1742 deaths
18th-century French writers
18th-century French male writers
18th-century French dramatists and playwrights
French opera librettists
French ballet librettists